Edward Brumley (7 May 1878 – 3 February 1942) was an English footballer who played as a centre-half.

References

1878 births
1942 deaths
Footballers from Grimsby
English footballers
Association football defenders
Humber Rovers F.C. players
Grimsby All Saints F.C. players
Grimsby Town F.C. players
Reading F.C. players
English Football League players